The House of Sheremetev was one of the wealthiest and most influential noble families in Russia descending from Feodor Koshka who was of Old Prussian origin.

History 
The family held many high commanding ranks in the Russian military, governorships and eventually the rank of Count of the Russian Empire.

Notable members 
 Yelena Sheremeteva, third wife of Tsarevich Ivan Ivanovich (1554–1581), son of Ivan the Terrible.
Fedor Sheremetev (1570–1650) cousin of Tsar Michael I and head of government in 1613–18 and 1642–46
Vasily Borisovich Sheremetev (1622–1682) fought in Ukraine
 Count Boris Sheremetev (1652–1719) military leader and diplomat during the Great Northern War
 Count Pyotr Borisovich Sheremetev (1713—1788) son of Boris; courtier and noted patron of Russian theater
 Princess Natalia Borisovna Dolgorukova, daughter of Boris and wife of Prince Ivan Dolgorukov
 Count Nikolai Petrovich Sheremetev (1751–1809) son of Pyotr; noted patron of Russian theater
 Praskovia Kovalyova-Zhemchugova, a serf woman belonging to the Sheremetev family, who became an actress in the Sheremetev Serf Theatre and later married Nikolai Sheremetev
 Count Aleksandr Dmitriyevich Sheremetev (1859–1931) grandson of Nikolai and son of Dmitri; conductor, composer and entrepreneur
 Count Pierre Sheremetev, noted patron of the Conservatoire Rachmaninoff in Paris
 Romuald Szeremietiew (born 1945), Polish politician and independence activist in the Confederation of Independent Poland.
The village of Sheremetevo, which in turn gave name to the Sheremetyevo International Airport, is named after the family.

Etymology
Russian surnames are gender sensitive, the masculine form of the name being Sheremetev (Шереметев) and the feminine being rendered as Sheremeteva (Шереметева).

There are three theories about the origin of the surname, all of them indicate a Tatar and eastern origin for the family. One theory proposes that the name originated with the Turkic Chuvash language word seremet (шеремет), meaning "poor man".  Another theory translates the nickname Seremet as "having light steps", "hot" (about a horse),  while the third theory suggests that the name originates with the Tatar/Turkic-Persian shir Akhmat, which literally translates to "Tiger Ahmet" and can be read as both "brave Ahmet" and "Pious Ahmet."

References

Russian noble families